Édouard Adolphe Drumont (3 May 1844 – 5 February 1917) was a French antisemitic journalist, author and politician. He initiated the Antisemitic League of France in 1889, and was the founder and editor of the newspaper La Libre Parole.  After spending years of research, he synthesised three major types of antisemitism. The first type was traditional Catholic attitudes toward the alien "Christ killers" augmented by vehement antipathy toward the French Revolution. The second type was hostility toward capitalism. The third type was so-called scientific racism, based on the argument that races have fixed characteristics, and asserting that Jews have negative characteristics. 

Drumont's biographer, Grégoire Kauffmann, places Drumont within the counter-revolutionary tradition of Louis Veuillot, Antoine Blanc de Saint-Bonnet, and anti-modern Catholicism. Socialist leader Jean Jaurès stated that "all the ideas and arguments of Drumont were taken from certain clerical opponents of the French Revolution.

Early life
Drumont was born in Paris in 1844 to a family of porcelain-painters from Lille. He lost his father at the age of seventeen, and had to care for himself and earn his own livelihood from then onwards.

Public career
He first worked in government service, and later became a contributor to the press and was the author of a number of works, of which Mon vieux Paris (1879) was awarded by the French Academy. He also worked for Louis Veuillot's L'Univers.

Drumont's 1886 book, La France juive (Jewish France), attacked the role of Jews in France and argued for their exclusion from society. In 1892, Drumont initiated the newspaper the La Libre Parole which became known for intense antisemitism. 
Gaston Méry was soon made editor in chief due to his skill in exploiting scandalous affairs and his daring invective.
The newspaper took  "France for the French" as its motto.
The newspaper was sceptical of Léo Taxil's anti-Catholic Diana Vaughan hoax before Taxil admitted it in 1897.

For the French legislative election of May 1898, the antisemitic activist Max Régis endorsed Drumont before this election from Algiers.
On 8 May 1898, Édouard Drumont was elected triumphantly with 11,557 votes against 2,328 and 1,741 for his opponents.
Of six Algerian national deputies, four were elected on the platform of Regis's Anti-Jewish League.
Drumont represented Algiers in the Chamber of Deputies from 1898 to 1902. He was sued for accusing a parliamentary deputy of having accepted a bribe from the wealthy Jewish banker Édouard Alphonse de Rothschild to pass a piece of legislation the banker wanted.

Drumont had many devotees. He exploited the Panama Company scandal and reached the maximum of his notoriety during the Dreyfus Affair, in which he was the most strident of Alfred Dreyfus' accusers.

For his anti-Panama articles, Drumont was condemned to three months' imprisonment. In 1893, he was an unsuccessful candidate for the representation of Amiens; the next year he retired to Brussels. The Dreyfus affair helped him to regain popularity, and in 1898, he returned to France and was elected deputy for the first division of Algiers, but was defeated as a candidate for re-election in April–May 1902.

Works
 Mon vieux Paris (1878)
 Les Fêtes nationales à Paris (1878)
 Le Dernier des Trémolin (1879)
 Papiers inédits du Duc de Saint-Simon (1880)
 La Mort de Louis XIV (1880)
 La France juive (Jewish France, 1886)
 La France Juive devant l'opinion (1886)
 La Fin d'un monde : Étude psychologique et sociale (1889)
 La Dernière Bataille (1890)
 Le Testament d'un antisémite (1891)
 Le Secret de Fourmies (1892)
 De l'or, de la boue, du sang : Du Panama à l'anarchie (1896)
 Mon vieux Paris. Deuxième série (1897)
 La Tyrannie maçonnique (1899)
 Les Juifs contre la France (1899)
 Les Tréteaux du succès. Figures de bronze ou statues de neige (1900)
 Les Tréteaux du succès. Les héros et les pitres (1900)
 Le Peuple juif (1900)
 Vieux portraits, vieux cadres (1903)
 Sur le chemin de la vie (1914)

See also
 Panama scandals
 Dreyfus Affair
 Jules Guérin
 Henry Coston

References

Sources

Further reading
 Anderson, Thomas P. "Edouard Drumont and the Origins of Modern Anti-Semitism." Catholic Historical Review (1967): 28–42. in JSTOR
 Busi, Frederick. The pope of antisemitism: the career and legacy of Edouard-Adolphe Drumont (University Press of America, 1986)
 Byrnes, R. F. "Edouard Drumont and La France Juive." Jewish Social Studies (1948): 165–184. in JSTOR
 Isser, Natalie. Antisemitism during the French Second Empire (1991) online
 Antonio Areddu, Vita e morte del marchese di Mores Antoine Manca (1858-1896), Cagliari, Condaghes, 2018

External links

 
 Dreyfus Rehabilitated

1844 births
1917 deaths
Writers from Paris
Antisemitism in France
Burials at Père Lachaise Cemetery
French political writers
French journalists
French male non-fiction writers
Late modern Christian antisemitism
Antidreyfusards
Roman Catholic conspiracy theorists
Proto-fascists
Far-right politics in France
French duellists
French conspiracy theorists